Jonathan Arac is an American literary scholar.  He is the Andrew W. Mellon Professor of English at University of Pittsburgh, visiting professor at Columbia University and Director of Pitt's Humanities Center. He is also an editor of the literary journal Boundary 2.

Selected writings
Commissioned Spirits: The Shaping of Social Motion in Dickens, Carlyle, Melville, and Hawthorne, Rutgers University Press, New Brunswick, N.J.
Critical Genealogies: Historical Situations for Postmodern Literary Studies
"Huckleberry Finn" as Idol and Target: The Functions of Criticism in Our Time
The Emergence of American Literary Narrative, 1820-1860
Impure Worlds: The Institution of Literature in the Age of the Novel

References

External links
boundary 2
Arac's homepage from University of Pittsburgh's Department of English
Humanities Center at University of Pittsburgh
Arac's biography from Columbia University

Living people
American academics of English literature
University of Pittsburgh faculty
Year of birth missing (living people)